Microsteris is a monotypic genus of flowering plants in the phlox family containing the single species Microsteris gracilis, known by the common name slender phlox.

The segregation of this species into a genus of its own is controversial, and many botanists continue to include the plant in genus Phlox. Genetic analysis is continuing.

Distribution
Microsteris gracilis is native to western North America from northwestern Canada to the American Midwest and West Coast, through Mexico, as well as parts of South America. It is native to all the diverse plant communities in California.

Description
Microsteris gracilis is an annual herb which is variable in shape, taking a decumbent, branching, sometimes almost tuftlike form or growing erect and very slender. Its maximum height approaches 20 centimeters, but it may be much smaller.

The lance-shaped leaves are 1 to 3 centimeters long and oppositely arranged except for the upper ones, which are alternate. The herbage is glandular and hairy in texture. The inflorescence at the top of the stem bears one or more small flowers.

The flower has a tubular throat around a centimeter long encased in a tubular calyx of sepals. The flat corolla has five flat-tipped or notched lobes just 1 or 2 millimeters long. The flower is white to bright pink with a yellowish throat.

References

External links
Jepson Manual Treatment of Microsteris gracilis
USDA Plants Profile for Microsteris gracilis (slender phlox)
Microsteris gracilis — U.C. Photo gallery

Monotypic Ericales genera
Polemoniaceae
Flora of Mexico
Flora of Western Canada
Flora of the Northwestern United States
Flora of the Southwestern United States
Flora of California
Flora of Nebraska
Flora of South Dakota
Flora of South America
Flora of the California desert regions
Flora of the Cascade Range
Flora of the Great Basin
Flora of the Klamath Mountains
Flora of the Sierra Nevada (United States)
Natural history of the California chaparral and woodlands
Natural history of the California Coast Ranges
Natural history of the Peninsular Ranges
Natural history of the Transverse Ranges
Polemoniaceae genera
Flora without expected TNC conservation status